Dominique Costagliola (born May 17, 1954 in Asnières-sur-Seine) is a French epidemiologist and biostatistician, deputy director of the Pierre Louis Institute of Epidemiology and Public Health (iPLESP) and is considered a “leading AIDS specialist.”,

Biography
She earned a master's degree in physics from Pierre and Marie Curie University before graduating from Télécom Paris and defending a thesis in biological and medical engineering at Paris Diderot University.

Career
Costagliola began working at Inserm in 1982 and began her research in HIV in 1986.

Honors
Inserm 2020 Grand Prize
Inserm Research Prize in 2013
 1995: Knight of the National Order of Merit
2005: Knight of the National Order of the Legion of Honor
2006: Louis-Daniel Beauperthuy Prize of the Academy of Sciences
2014: Officer of the National Order of the Legion of Honor
2017: Member of the Academy of Sciences

References

French women epidemiologists
Biostatisticians
Pierre and Marie Curie University alumni
Paris Diderot University alumni
HIV/AIDS researchers
1954 births
Living people